Roberta Voss (born January 21, 1965) is a former member of the Arizona House of Representatives. She served in the House from January 1997 through January 2003, serving district 19.

References

Republican Party members of the Arizona House of Representatives
1965 births
Living people